Kakraula is a small village in Chauparan. It is part of the district of Hazaribag in Jharkhand.

Population distribution
 State - Jharkhand
 District - Hazaribagh
 Tahsil - Chauparan
 Village  - Kakraula
 Male Population  - 140
 Female Population  - 143
 Kakraula Ward Member Name Shri Munshi Yadav
 Total Population  - 283

References

Villages in Hazaribagh district